Mrinal Deo-Kulkarni (born 21 June 1971) is a senior film, TV actress and director of India. She is better known for her role as Meerabai in doordarshan's Meerabai seriel and angel in Hindi TV serial Son Pari. She has acted in Marathi language and Hindi TV serials and films.

Early life, family and education
She was born in a Marathi Deshastha Brahmin family in Pune. Her parents are Dr. Vijay Deo and Dr. Veena Deo. She has a Master's degree in Linguistics from Pune University. She has a sister named Madhura. She lost her father after illness on 11 April 2019. 

She married her childhood friend Ruchir Kulkarni in 1990 and has a son Virajas who is also a part of Marathi film industry.

Acting career

Mrinal was 16 when she made her debut in the role of Peshawe Madhavrao's wife, Ramabai Peshawe, in the Marathi TV serial Swami. This gave her a popularity. Ravindra Mankani played the role of Madhavrao.

She was not very serious about acting. Instead, she wanted to complete doctorate in philosophy. But offers kept coming her way and finally she decided to make a career in acting in 1994. She continued with acting as her career on receiving, many more successful roles, including those in Shrikant (a TV serial based on one of Saratchandra Chatterjee's novels), The Great Maratha, Draupadi, Hasratein, Meerabai, Teacher, Khel, Sparsh and Sonpari. Her role in the TV serial Avantika on Alpha Marathi channel has received much acclaim. Mrinal is famous for playing a number of historic characters –Meerabai,  Draupadi , Ahilya Bai Holkar, Ramabai, Jijabai etc. She had done 22 Hindi TV shows till now. She stopped acting in TV serial to focus on her direction venture.

She has also done a few advertisements as well.

Mrinal Kulkarni has acted in Marathi as well as Bollywood films.

Direction 
Mrinal Kulkarni debuted as a Director for the Marathi film, Prem Mhanje... Prem Mhanje.... Prem Asta. The story of the film has been written by Mrunal Kulkarni. After that, she directed Marathi historical drama Rama Madhav.

Filmography

Marathi films
 Maza Saubhagya (1994)
 Jamla Ho Jamla (1995)
Jodidar (2000) Marathi film
 Veer Savarkar (film) (2001)
 Vishwaas (2003)
 Thang (2005)
 Rajkaran (2005)
 Bayo (2006)
 Kashala Udyachi Baat (2012)
 Aarohi Gosht Tighanchi (2012)
 Jai Jai Maharashtra Majha (2012) 
 Deha (2013) 
 Lekroo (2000) 
 Tujhya Majhyat (2008) 
 Prem Mhanje Prem Mhanje Prem Asta (2013)
 A Rainy Day (2014) 
 Yellow (2014 film) (2014)
 Rama Madhav (2014)
 Rajwade and Sons (2015)
 & Jara Hatke (2016) 
 Farzand (2018)
 Ye Re Ye Re Paisa (2018)
 Ye Re Ye Re Paisa 2 (2019)
 Fatteshikast (2019)
 Pawankhind (2022)
 Sher Shivraj (2022)
 Saath Sobat (2023)

Hindi films
 Kamla Ki Maut (1989)
 Jai Dakshineshwar Kali Ma (1996)
 Dr. Babasaheb Ambedkar (2000); played the role of Savita Ambedkar
 Aashiq (2001)
 Veer Savarkar (2001)
 Uuf Kya Jaadoo Mohabbat Hai... (2004)
 Kuchh Meetha Ho Jaye (2005)
 Quest (2006)
 Chodo Kal Ki Baatein (2012)
 Raja Shivchattrapati (2012)
 Made in China (2019 film) (2019)
 Ram Gopal Varma Ki Aag (2007)
 Raasta Roko (2006)
 A Rainy Day (2014)
 Sambhaji 1689 (2017)
 Lekar Hum Deewana Dil (2014)
 The Kashmir Files (2022)
 Dear Dia (2022)

Television
 Swami
 Shrikant 
 Saturday Suspense
 Rishtey  
 Raja Ki Aayegi Baraat 
 Son Pari
 Sparsh 
 Chattan
 Teacher
 Zindagi... Teri Meri Kahani
 Kaali – Ek Agnipariksha 
 Guntata Hriday He (Marathi)
 Hasratein 
 Neelanjana
 Avantika (Marathi)
 Beta
 Happy Journey (Marathi)
 Khamoshiyaan
 The Great Maratha 
 Meerabai 
 Raja Shivchatrapati (Marathi)
 Noorjahan 
 Draupadi
 Astitva...Ek Prem Kahani

Web series

Films written and directed
Rama Madhav - 2014
Prem Mhanje Prem Mhanje Prem Asta - 2013
Ti and Ti - 2019

Television commercial
   Popular Tv commercial Vicco Turmeric ayurvedic skin cream

Awards
Kulkarni has won following awards-
 2001 Screen Award in the Best Actress category for her role in the Marathi film Jodidar (2000).
 National Award for movie Thang/The Quest directed by Amol Palekar.

References

External links

 
 
 
 

21st-century Indian actresses
Living people
Indian soap opera actresses
1968 births
Actresses in Marathi cinema
Marathi film directors
Actresses from Pune
Indian women film directors
21st-century Indian film directors
Film directors from Maharashtra
1971 births